Zhdanov (also, Kishlag) is a town in the Lori Province of Armenia. The town was renamed in honor of Andrei Zhdanov.

References

Populated places in Lori Province